The Cornell Big Red Pep Band is Cornell University's student-run pep band that performs primarily at Cornell Men's ice hockey, with frequent appearances at Women's ice hockey, Men's and Women's lacrosse and basketball, and occasional appearances at a diverse array of other events, such as wrestling, soccer, field hockey, building dedications, and other university events.

History
Until 1986, the Big Red Pep Band was a subsidiary of the Cornell Big Red Marching Band, with the Marching Band's Drum Major serving as one of the two conductors, and the Pep Band's Head Manager was simply an elected member of the Marching Band's board.

In November 1985, the Big Red Bands voted to make the Big Red Pep Band a separate organization in order for it to secure its own funding, have more independent direction, and cater to members who were not necessarily part of the Marching Band. However, there is still much overlap between the two organizations, with a majority of Pep Band members also being involved with the Marching Band, and the elected Pep Band Head Manager serving on the Marching Band's Board. 

Beginning in the late nineties, the Pep Band began branching out from playing primarily for hockey games to play at the majority of home men's lacrosse games, numerous basketball games, along with other assorted events. Despite this, the band remains dedicated to hockey, appearing at all home games and a majority of away games.

BRPB Today

Rehearsals and Performances

As of May 2017, the Pep Band rehearses from 4:45-6:00 pm every Monday in the Fischell Band Center during the regular fall and spring semesters. Rehearsals are typically run with each of the two conductors taking turns going over one to two sets of three songs each, with a short break in between conductors. Important announcements are made by the pep band manager during this break.

The band performs at sporting events most weekends, with many weekends in the Spring semester containing two or more events in a single day. If the band is scheduled to perform at two conflicting times, the pep band manager splits the group based upon instrumentation and priority points. Those attending less popular events (e.g. Women's basketball) are rewarded with more priority points than more popular ones (e.g. Men's Ice Hockey.) This gives new members of the band a chance to accumulate priority points quickly and helps assure good instrumentation at less popular events.

Board and Conductors
Every December, the Pep Band meets and elects the board for the next calendar year. The positions are:

Manager: responsible for all the logistics for the band, including arranging for accommodations, travel, and tickets for away games, and generally being the band's public representative
Treasurer: responsible for keeping records of band expenditures and formulating budgeting requests in association with the Big Red Bands Alumni Association (BRBAA) and the Cornell Student Assembly Finance Commission
Librarian: makes sure copies of music are distributed to all members
Secretary: publicizes Pep Band events and keeps minutes of all board meetings
Historian: takes pictures and otherwise records or maintains information about the band for posterity
Equipment Chair: works alongside the Big Red Marching Band equipment chair to maintain or order instruments for the band

In addition, 2 student conductors are elected at the end of each semester to serve for the next semester.

Instrumentation
The Pep Band is allocated 51 tickets for home hockey games, and travels with 25 to 41 members to away games. Typical instrumentation for a home hockey game might be as follows :
12 Trumpets
10 Trombones and Baritones
8 Saxophones
6 Flutes
4 Clarinets
2 Mellophones
5 Percussionists
3 Tubas
1 Conductor

However, instrumentation varies depending on availability of members and how many priority points members have accumulated by attending past performances and rehearsals. Due to the extreme academic pressure inherent to an institution as prestigious as Cornell University and student leadership, participation is purely voluntary without any strict attendance policies or lengthy auditions. Despite (or perhaps because of) this relaxed demeanor, the Big Red Pep Band is acknowledged as one of the best pep bands in college hockey .

Music
The Pep Band has a large and diverse repertoire, much of which consists of custom arrangements done by members of the band. This allows the band to go multiple events before it is necessary to repeat songs, and have enough shorter pieces to perform during stoppages in play to last even triple overtime games without repeating.

The actual pieces are widely varied, from traditional Cornell songs such as "Give my Regards to Davy"(the official fight song), the Alma Mater "Far Above Cayuga's Waters", and "My Old Cornell", to more modern pieces, such as The Who's "Pinball Wizard", "Everybody's Everything", "Rock & Roll part 2", "España", "Paradise City", and "Gonna Fly Now". 

The band is also (in)famous for such shenanigans as mockingly greeting the Harvard University Men's Hockey Team (see Cornell-Harvard hockey rivalry) with the theme from 'Love Story', Michigan State University and Ohio State University with "Hail to the Victors," Colorado College with "DU, Rah!," Boston College with "The Notre Dame Victory March," Army with "Anchors Aweigh", University of Vermont with "Baby Elephant Walk" and University of Minnesota with "On, Wisconsin!."

External links
Cornell University Big Red Bands
Cornell University Big Red Pep Band

Cornell Big Red
Pep bands